C More Kids was a Scandinavian premium television channel showing family movies and programs from CBeebies. The channel was closed 1 February 2015. The content previously shown on the channel is available in the C More Play on demand streaming library.

The channel broadcast from 6.30 a.m. to 6 p.m.

References

Defunct television channels in Denmark
Defunct television channels in Norway
Defunct television channels in Sweden
Defunct television channels in Finland
Television channels and stations established in 2011
Television channels and stations disestablished in 2015
Pan-Nordic television channels